Music of the World Cup: Allez! Ola! Olé! is a compilation album with various artists, released on 9 June 1998. This album is the official music album of the 1998 FIFA World Cup in France.

Track listing
"The Cup of Life" – Ricky Martin (The Official 1998 FIFA World Cup Song)
"Do You Mind If I Play – Youssou N'Dour & Axelle Red (The Official 1998 FIFA World Cup Anthem)
"I Love Football" (Cameroon) – Wes
"Rendez-Vous '98" (France & England) – Jean Michel Jarre & ApolloFourForty
"Oh Eh Oh Eh" (France) – Gipsy Kings
"País Tropical" (Brazil) – Daniela Mercury
"Tamborada" (Mexico) – Fey
"MaWe" (South Africa) – M'du
"Don't Come Home Too Soon" (Scotland) – Del Amitri
"Hot Legs" (Denmark) – M.A.T.C.H.
"Il Bello Della Vita" (Italy) – Spagna
"Pantera en Libertad" (Spain) – Monica Naranjo
"Rise Up" (Jamaica) – Jamaica United
"It's Only a Game" (Germany) – Jam & Spoon
"Together Now" (France & Japan) – Jean Michel Jarre & Tetsuya 'TK' Komuro
"Top of the World (Olé, Olé, Olé)" (England) – Chumbawamba
"É Uma Partida de Futebol" (Brazil) – Skank
"Los Sueños de Todo el Mundo" (Argentina) – Soledad
"Kick Off" (Netherlands) – Slagerij van Kampen
"Colors of the World" (Taiwan) – CoCo Lee
"Samba E Gol" (Germany) – Bellini
"La Copa de la Vida" (Spanish) – Ricky Martin

Charts

References

See also
List of FIFA World Cup songs and anthems

1998 FIFA World Cup
1998 compilation albums
FIFA World Cup albums
Sony Music compilation albums